Peter Cochrane Forster (29 June 1920 – 16 November 1982) was a British film and television actor. He was born and brought up in London, England, where he trained to become an actor before moving to Los Angeles. He married actress Jennifer Raine; the couple's son, Brian Forster, was born in 1960.

Forster's appearances in film include Dangerous Charter, The Three Stooges Go Around the World in a Daze, and Escape from the Planet of the Apes. He appeared on television in shows including The Untouchables, Hazel. Forster died of a heart attack in 1982.

Filmography

External links 

1920 births
1982 deaths
British expatriate male actors in the United States
British male film actors
British male television actors
Male actors from London
20th-century British male actors